The 23rd Golden Bell Awards was held on 19 March 1988 at the National Theater Hall in Taipei, Taiwan. The ceremony was broadcast by China Television (CTV).

Winners

References

1988
1988 in Taiwan